The following is a list of Chinese women writers.

B
Consort Ban (c. 48 – c. 6 BCE) scholar and poet 
Ban Zhao (45 – c. 116) historian
Bao Junhui (fl. late 8th c. CE) poet
Bao Linghui (fl. c. 464 CE) poet
Anni Baobei (born 1974) novelist
Bing Xin (1900–1999) fiction and children's writer

C
Cai Yan (c. 178 – post 206) poet
Chang Ch'ung-ho (1914–2015) poet
Eileen Chang (1920–1995) novelist, essayist and screenwriter
Chen Jingrong (1917–1989) poet
Chen Danyan (born 1958) biographer
Chen Xuezhao (1906–1991) writer and commentator
Angelica Cheung (born 1966) fashion writer

D
Dai Houying (1938–1996) novelist
Ding Ling (1904–1986) fiction writer
Duan Shuqing (c. 1510 – c. 1600) poet

F
Fang Fang (born 1955) poet and novelist
Bu Feiyan (born 1981) novelist
Feng Yuanjun (1900–1974) scholar
Fu Shanxiang (1833–1864) scholar
Fu Tianlin (born 1946) poet

G
Gao Yu (born 1944) journalist
Gu Taiqing (1799 – c. 1877) poet
Guan Daosheng (1262–1319) poet

H
Hao Jingfang (born 1984) novelist
Hong Ying (born 1962) novelist and poet
Ganggang Hu Guidice (born 1984) writer and artist
Hu Lanqi (1901–1994) writer and military leader 
Huang E (1498–1569) poet
Madame Huarui (c. 940–976) poet

J
Jiang Biwei (1899–1978) memoirist

K
Ke Yan (1929–2011) playwright, novelist and poet

L
Li Qingzhao (1084 – c. 1151) writer and poet
Li Ye (died 784) poet and courtesan
Liang Desheng (1771–1847) poet and writer
Lin Huiyin (1904–1955) architectural historian
Lin Zongsu (1878–1944) women's rights essayist
Ling Shuhua (1900–1990) modernist writer and painter
Liu Rushi (1618–1664) poet
Liu Ying (born 1974) novelist
Lü Bicheng (1883–1943) poet and commentator
Luo Luo (born 1982) novelist
Lüqiu Luwei (born 1969) journalist

M
Mian Mian (born 1970) fiction writer

P
Lynn Pan (born 1945) travel writer

Q
Qiu Jin (1875–1907) poet, essayist and political writer

R
Rao Xueman (born 1972) fiction writer, essayist and blogger
Ru Zhijuan (1925–1998) fiction writer

S
Shangguan Wan'er (c. 664–710) poet and writer
Shen Qing (living) fashion writer
Shen Rong (born 1936) fiction writer and essayist
Shen Shanbao (1808–1862) poet and writer
Shu Ting (born 1952) poet
Su Hui poet
Su Qing (1914–1982) essayist
Su Xiaoxiao (c. 479 – c. 501) poet
Su Xuelin (1897–1999) author and scholar

T
Tian Yuan (born 1985) singer-songwriter and novelist
Tie Ning (born 1957) novelist and short story writer

W
Wang Qinghui (1264–1288) poet
Wang Anyi (born 1954) fiction writer
Wang Wei (1597–1647) poet
Wang Xufeng (born 1955) writer on tea and novelist
Wang Yun (1749–1819) poet and playwright
Yun Wang (born 1964) poet
Woeser (born 1966) blogger, poet and essayist 
Wu Chuntao (born 1963) social writer
Wu Zao (1799–1862) poet
Madame Wu (born 13th century) cookbook writer

X
Xi Xi (1937-2022) novelist and poet
Xia Jia (born 1984) science fiction and fantasy writer
Xiao Hong (1911–1942) fiction writer and essayist
Xie Bingying (1906–2000) autobiographer
Xie Daoyun poet and scholar
Empress Xu (Ming dynasty) (1362–1407)
Lady Xu Mu (fl. 7th c. BCE) poet
Xu Hui (627–650) poet
Xu Kun (born 1965) postmodern fiction writer
Xu Zihua (1873–1935) poet
Xue Susu (c. 1564 – c. 1650) poet
Xue Tao (768–831) poet
Xinran (born 1958) non-fiction writer

Y
Yang Erche Namu (born 1966) social writer
Yang Gang (1905–1957) journalist, novelist and translator
Yang Hongying (born 1962) children's fiction writer
Yang Jiang (1911–2016) playwright, author and translator
Lizzie Yu Der Ling (1885–1944), writer of several memoirs
Nellie Yu Roung Ling (1889–1973), author of a memoir and a novella
Ting-Xing Ye (born 1952) author of young adult novels
Ye Yingchun (born 1970) commentator
Chia-ying Yeh (born 1924) poet and scholar
Yu Xuanji (c. 840 – c. 868) poet

Z
Zhai Yongming (born 1955) poet
Lijia Zhang (born 1964) commentator and public speaker
Zeng Baosun (1893–1978) historian
Zhang Haidi (born 1955) writer and translator
Zhang Huaicun (born 1972) novelist, poet and children's writer
Zhang Jie (1937–2022) fiction writer
Zhang Kangkang (born 1950) fiction writer
Zhang Ling (born 1957) fiction writer
Zhang Xinxin (born 1953) biographer and fiction writer
Zhang Yaotiao (fl. 9th c. CE) poet
Zhang Yueran (born 1982) fiction writer
Empress Zhangsun (601–636) essayist
Zhao Luanluan (fl. mid-14th c. CE) poet
Zhao Luorui (1912–1998) poet and translator
Zheng Min (1920–2022) scholar and poet
Zheng Yunduan (c. 1327–1356) poet
Yilin Zhong (living) fiction writer and poet
Zhou Weihui (born 1973) novelist
Zong Pu (born 1928) writer and scholar
Zhu Lin (born 1949) novelist
Zhu Shuzhen (c. 1135–1180) poet
Zhuo Wenjun (fl. 2nd c. BCE) poet
Zuo Fen (c. 255–300) poet

See also
List of Chinese writers
List of women writers
List of Chinese-language poets

Writers
-
Writers and women
Chinese
Writers and women